Valet Records was an Australian independent record label established in O'Connor, Western Australia by Matt Wardle in 2005. The label manager, Jaun-Paul Rebola, was the vocalist and guitarist for the band, Calerway. In August 2005 the label issued an extended play and its associated DVD for Brisbane-based group, Avalon Drive.

Artists

 Avalon Drive: Avalon Drive (EP, 2005) The City of Burnt Out Lights (EP, 2006), "Get Up" (2006)
 Calerway: A Letter of Creedence (EP, 1 May 2006) "Loaded" (2005), "Always Always" (2005)
 Fifty Six: Gunpowder Office (EP, 6 November 2006) (Mmvr002) "Let It Ride" (2006)

See also

List of record labels

References

External links
 

Record labels established in 2005
Australian independent record labels
Rock record labels